Infinity Coast Tower is a residential condominium skyscraper in the coastal city of Balneário Camboriú, Santa Catarina, southern Brazil. At 234.7 metres (770 feet) and over 60 floors, it was the tallest building in Brazil until 2020, the year of completion of the Yachthouse Residence Club twin towers, located in the same city. Construction of Infinity Coast started in 2013 and ended in 2019. The ones who conceived the project did not intend to build the country's tallest skyscraper.

References

See also
 Yachthouse Residence Club
 Millennium Palace
 List of tallest buildings in Brazil
 List of tallest buildings in South America

Balneário Camboriú
Buildings and structures in Santa Catarina (state)
Residential skyscrapers in Brazil
Buildings and structures completed in 2019
Residential skyscrapers